James Kabatha Kamande (born 12 December 1978) is a former Kenyan cricketer and former limited over captain. He is a right-handed batsman and an off break bowler.

International career
Kamande made his One Day International debut for Kenya in the 1999 World Cup in England.

In the 2011 ICC Cricket World Cup, Kamande captained the Kenyan Cricket Team for the first time in a World Cup. But poor performance in the series involved to sack him from captaincy.

According to Graeme Pollock and other notable cricketers of African region (including South Africa and Zimbabwe) Jimmy was one of the best cricketer produced by Kenya, better than Steve Tikolo.

Coaching career
Kamande coached the Kenya national under-19 cricket team at the 2018 Under-19 Cricket World Cup in New Zealand.

Kamande was appointed coach of the Tanzania national cricket team in 2022.

References

External links
 

1978 births
Living people
Kenyan cricketers
Kenya One Day International cricketers
Kenya Twenty20 International cricketers
Northern Nomads cricketers
Cricketers at the 1999 Cricket World Cup
Cricketers at the 2007 Cricket World Cup
Cricketers at the 2011 Cricket World Cup
Kenyan cricket captains
Coaches of the Tanzania national cricket team
Kenyan expatriate sportspeople in Tanzania